Hirano (the kanji character 平 is for "flat, plain, calm" and the kanji character 野 is for "field") can be a Japanese surname. 

The same combination of kanji characters read as "Heiya" can mean a plain or a flat land.

People named Hirano include 
Asao Hirano (1926-2019), Japanese physician, academic, medical researcher and neuropathology professor
Aya Hirano (平野綾, born 1987), Japanese voice actress and singer
Ayumu Hirano (平野歩夢, born 1955), Japanese Olympic snowboarder and skateboarder
Fumi Hirano (平野文) (born 1955), Japanese voice actress, singer and essayist
Irene Hirano (1948–2020), founding President of the U.S.-Japan Council
Ken Hirano (平野謙 (評論家), 1910—1978), Japanese literary critic
Kaishu Hirano (born 2002), Japanese snowboarder
Keiichiro Hirano (平野啓一郎, born 1975), Japanese novelist
Kouta Hirano (平野耕太, born 1973), Japanese manga artist
Masaaki Hirano (平野雅章, 1931—2008), Japanese food historian
Masato Hirano (voice actor) (平野正人, born 1955), Japanese voice actor
, Japanese sport shooter
Hirano Nagayasu (平野長泰, 1559—1628), Japanese Samurai
Nobutaka Hirano (平野信孝, born 1972), Japanese volleyball player
Remi Hirano (平野レミ, born 1947), Japanese cooking enthusiast, TV persona and singer
, Japanese ballet dancer
Sayaka Hirano (平野早矢香, born 1985), Japanese table tennis player
, Japanese ice hockey player
Toshiki Hirano (平野俊貴, born 1956), Japanese anime director, animator, and character designer
, Japanese triathlete
Yoshihisa Hirano (平野義久, born 1971), Japanese composer and arranger
Yoshihisa Hirano (baseball) (平野佳寿, born 1984), Japanese baseball player
Yoshiko Hirano (世志琥, born 1993), Japanese professional wrestler
Yuichi Hirano (平野佑一, born 1996), Japanese footballer
, Japanese ice hockey player

Places
 Hirano-ku - one of the 24 wards of Osaka City
 Hirano Shrine, a Shinto shrine in the city of Kyoto

Railway stations
Hirano Station (平野駅) is the name of four railway stations in Japan:

 Hirano Station (Fukushima)
 Hirano Station (Hyogo)
 Hirano Station (JR West)
 Hirano Station (Osaka Municipal Subway)

Japanese-language surnames